State Route 292 (SR 292), also known as Baptist Ridge Road, is a  east-west state highway in northeastern Middle Tennessee.

Route description

SR 292 begins in Clay County at an intersection with SR 53 at Butlers Landing along the banks of the Cumberland River. It winds its way east through mountains to pass through Baptist Ridge and the southern sliver of Standing Stone State Forest before crossing into Overton County. The highway straightens out as it turns southeast through flatter terrain for several miles before entering Hilham and coming to an end at a Y-intersection with SR 136. The entire route of SR 292 is a rural two-lane highway.

Major intersections

References

292
Transportation in Clay County, Tennessee
Transportation in Overton County, Tennessee